The 2021 GP Miguel Induráin was the 67th edition of the GP Miguel Induráin road cycling one day race, which was held on 3 April 2021, that started and finished in Estella. The 1.Pro-category race was initially scheduled to be a part of the inaugural edition of the UCI ProSeries, but after the 2020 edition was cancelled due to the COVID-19 pandemic, it made its UCI ProSeries debut in 2021, while also still being a part of the 2021 UCI Europe Tour.

Teams 
Nine of the nineteen UCI WorldTeams, eight UCI ProTeams, and two UCI Continental teams made up the nineteen teams that participated in the race.

UCI WorldTeams

 
 
 
 
 
 
 
 
 

UCI ProTeams

 
 
 
 
 
 
 
 

UCI Continental Teams

Result

References

Sources

External links 
 

2021
GP Miguel Induráin
GP Miguel Induráin
GP Miguel Induráin
GP Miguel Induráin